John Anthony Newton CBE (28 September 1930 – 17 March 2017) was a  Methodist minister, author, historian and former President of the Methodist Conference. Newton was the president of the Wesley Historical Society. Newton was educated at Boston Grammar School in Lincolnshire.

Newton was a noted authority on the Wesley family. His book Susanna, Susanna Wesley and the Puritan Tradition in Methodism, is recognised as the authoritative biography of Susanna Wesley.

References

1930 births
2017 deaths
Commanders of the Order of the British Empire
Presidents of the Methodist Conference
English Methodists
English Christian theologians
Methodist theologians
Methodist ministers
People educated at Boston Grammar School